Riders of the Rio is a 1931 American western film directed by Robert Emmett Tansey and starring Lane Chandler, Sheldon Lewis and Ben Corbett. It is an independently-produced second feature, shot partly on location around Palm Springs, California.

Synopsis
Two rival cattle ranchers battle over the affections of Nieta, a beautiful Mexican cantina singer.

Cast
 Lane Chandler as 	Bob Lane
 Karla Cowan as 	Nieta
 Sheldon Lewis as 	Tony
 Bob Card as 	Travis
 James Sheridan as 	Buck 
 Fred Parker as 	Dad Lane
 Ben Corbett as 	One-Shot
 Jack Kirk as Tom - Bob's Pal	
 Bud Duncan as The Peddler
 Mary Thompson as 	Mrs. Lane
 Horace B. Carpenter as The Sheriff
 Amelia Mio as Captain Fernandez
 Lorena Carr as Doris Hart

References

Bibliography
 Pitts, Michael R. Western Movies: A Guide to 5,105 Feature Films. McFarland, 2012.

External links
 

1931 films
1931 Western (genre) films
1930s English-language films
American black-and-white films
American Western (genre) films
Films directed by Robert Emmett Tansey
1930s American films